The Moscow tramway network, which is divided into two sub-networks, is a key element of the public transport system in Moscow, the capital city of Russia. Opened in 1872, it has been operated since 1958 until 2021 by Mosgortrans, a state-owned company.

Overview

The tram is historically the second type of urban passenger transport in Moscow, the successor of the Konka (horse-driven tram). However, the presence in Moscow by the beginning of the 20th century horse-railways hindered the development of tram lines. For the laying of tram lines, it was necessary first to free the roads from horse tracks. In 1901, the council purchased the first competition of the Belgian joint-stock company. When, in 1903, came a period of redemption horse-drawn railway the second Belgian joint stock company, the Duma is not solved, as, according to N. I. Astrov: "In Russia we have not experienced builders and engineers". In November 1905, immediately after the events of October elected a new mayor Nikolai Guchkov. Its launching coincided with the revolutionary actions of workers of Moscow in November–December 1905. As soon as the life in the town had returned to normal, Nikolai Ivanovich ordered to proceed with the laying of tram tracks. In February 1907, construction finally began on Myasnitska Street, Sretenka Street and Lubyanka Street, from the Passion of the monastery Dmitrovka and further on down, to the Sretenka and Myasnitskaya. The first electric tram routes linked the outskirts of the Garden ring with the center of Moscow, and mainly repeated the routes of the konechnye.

18 May 1910 the city council on the proposal of N. I. Guchkov made a decision about carrying out in 1912 in Moscow, the congress of tram companies.

To the 1910 years the dense network of lines was observed in the western part of the centre with the formation of arcs on the Garden and Boulevard rings.

History of the network

The apogee of Moscow's tram network was in the early 1930s, when it served both rings (the Boulevard and the Garden) and all connecting streets,  were laid and on the outskirts. In 1934, when the tram was the dominant mode of transport, 2.6 million of the city's population of 4 million used the tram every day. More radical changes took place in the 1940s, when trams were replaced by trolleybuses in the western part of the Boulevard Ring and removed from the Kremlin. With the development of the metro in the 1950s some of the lines leading to the suburbs were closed, and the carriage of freight ceased.

In 1958, the tram and trolleybus administration was merged with the passenger transport department to form the Department of Passenger Transport of Moscow (UPTM), which operated all three types of surface public transport: bus, trolleybus and tram.

In the 1960s and 1970s, tram lines were finally eliminated in the western part of the city and from the Garden Ring. However, new lines were laid in areas that were not served by the metro: Medvedkovo, Chertanovo, Perovo and Novogireevo. After the closure of the lines between Nizhnyaya Maslovka and Tikhvinovskaya streets in 1965 and on Bolshaya Gruzinskaya street in 1973, the lines operating from the Krasnaya Presnya tram depot in the north-west of the city was severed from the rest of the network. In the mid-1990s a new wave of line closures started, mainly on major highways near the city centre. In 1995, the company closed the line on Mira Avenue, then at the Nizhnyaya Maslovka due to the construction of the 3rd ring road. For the same reason in the early 2000s, the rails on Begovaya street, near the Ulitsa 1905 Goda metro station and on Dvintsev street were removed. In 2004, in connection with forthcoming reconstruction, the Leningradskiy avenue line was closed. In 2008 the lines on Lesnaya street and Volokolamskoe highway closed. In 1990 daily ridership was over 800,000, but by the late 1990s this had fallen to about 150,000 passengers. From 30 to 31 August 2013 in the framework of the experimental introduction of night routes of public transport route No. 3 is translated to round-the-clock work, however, as of May 2020, the route now is back to operating from 5:00 to 1:00.

Tram network today 
As of 2021, Moscow has introduced open gangway trams beginning with service in the north-west of the city. These trains accommodate 110 passengers and have 18% more seats than those of the previous generation, as well as USB ports and media screens.

In August 2021 Moscow ended operations of the Czech-designed high-floor Tatra T3 trams, which had operated in the city since 1963.

List of routes

А. Novokonnaya ploschad' (Square) – Chistyye prudy subway station

Б. Sokol'nicheskaya Zastava – Kursky Railway Station

1. Moskvoretsky Market – Ulitsa Akademika Yangelya (Academic Yangel St.)

2. Semyonovskaya subway station – Metrogorodok

3. Chistye prudy subway station – Balaklavsky Prospect (Avenue)

4. Bulvar Rokossovskovo subway station – Kursky Railway Station

6. Sokol subway station – Bratsevo

7. Bulvar Rokossovskovo subway station – Belorussky Rail Terminal

9. Belorussky Rail Terminal – MIIT (only in weekdays)

10. Shchukinskaya subway station – Ulitsa Kulakova (Kulakov St.)

11. Ostankino – 16th Parkovaya St.

12. 16th Parkovaya St. – 2nd ulitsa Mashinostroyeniya (2nd Machinbuilding St.)

13. Kalanchovskaya St. – Metrogorodok

14. Oktyabrskaya subway station – Universitet subway station

15. Sokol subway station – Tallinskaya Str.

16. Novodanilovsky Proezd (Drive) – Ulitsa Akademika Yangelya (Academic Yangel St.)

17. Ostankino – Medvedkovo

20. Kursky Rail Terminal – Krasnokazarmennaya Ploschad' (Square)

21. Tallinskaya St. – Schukinskaya subway station

23. Sokol subway station – Mikhalkovo

24. Kursky Railway Station – Proezd Entuziastov (Enthusiasts' drive)

25. Ostankino – Sokol'nicheskaya Zastava

26. Oktyabrskaya subway station – Universitet subway station (through Cheryomushki)

27. Voikovskaya subway station – Dmitrovskaya subway station

28. Prospekt Marshala Zhukova (Avenue of marshal Zhukov) – Sokol subway station

29. Dmitrovskaya subway station – Mikhalkovo

30. Tallinskaya St. – Mikhalkovo

31. Prospekt Marshala Zhukova (Avenue of marshal Zhukov) – Voikovskaya underground station

34. 16th Parkovaya St. – Semyonovskaya subway station

36. Metrogorodok – Novogireyevo

37. Kalanchyovskaya St. – Novogireyevo

38. Cheryomushki – 3rd Vladimirskaya St.

39. Chistye prudy subway station – Universitet subway station

43. Ugreshskaya MCC – 3rd Vladimirskaya St.

45. Novokonnaya ploschad' (Square) - Sokol'nicheskaya Zastava

46. Bulvar Rokossovskovo subway station – Oktyabrskoe tram depot

47. Nagatino – Oktyabrskaya subway station

49. Nagatino – Novodanilovsky Proezd (Drive)

50. Proezd Entuziastov (Enthusiasts' drive) – Novoslobodskaya subway station

Rolling stock 
This table does not include vehicles on short term trials and does not include vehicles that are purely in museum service.

See also

 List of town tramway systems in Russia
Moscow Metro
Moscow Monorail
Transportation in Moscow

References

External links

 Mosgortrans – official website
 
 
 Moscow (trams) at UrbanRail.net
 route map

Transport in Moscow
Moscow
550 V DC railway electrification
Moscow